Davy De fauw (born 8 July 1981) is a Belgian former professional footballer who played as a right-back.

Career
De fauw played for Club Brugge from age five until he was brought to Dutch club Sparta Rotterdam by then manager Frank Rijkaard. In the 2001–02 season, he made his professional debut for Sparta. On 16 March 2002 in the 0–4 away loss to Willem II in the Eredivisie, De fauw came on as a substitute for the injured David Mendes da Silva after 16 minutes.

In January 2006, De fauw signed for Roda JC, joining the club from 30 June 2006. There he quickly became a permanent starter in defense and made more than 180 appearances in the Eredivisie.

De fauw returned to his native Belgium in the 2011–12 season, signing for Zulte Waregem. There, he was immediately appointed team captain after the departure of Ludwin Van Nieuwenhuyze. At the start of the 2013–14 season, De fauw had to give up his captaincy to Thorgan Hazard. This was received with much anger from a section of the club's supporters, and led to Hazard handing the captain's armband back, less than 24 hours after receiving it.

On 20 June 2014, it was announced that he had signed for Club Brugge for €200,000; thus returning to the team where he had started his career.

For the 2016–17 season De fauw returned to Zulte Waregem.

Coaching career
In April 2020, De fauw announced his retirement from football. Instead, he became assistant coach of Zulte Waregem alongside fellow former player Timmy Simons.

Personal life
Unusually, De fauw's family name is written with a lowercase "f". Asked about this, De fauw said: "I hail from Maria-Aalter. My dad always said that the person in the town hall may have been a little drunk and therefore wrote the family name with a small f. That's how it happened".

Honours
Club Brugge
Belgian Cup: 2014–15
Belgian Pro League: 2015–16

References

External links

1981 births
Living people
People from Aalter
Belgian footballers
Club Brugge KV players
Sparta Rotterdam players
Roda JC Kerkrade players
S.V. Zulte Waregem players
Belgian Pro League players
Eredivisie players
Eerste Divisie players
Belgian expatriate sportspeople in the Netherlands
Belgian expatriate footballers
Expatriate footballers in the Netherlands
Association football defenders
Footballers from East Flanders